Greg McLean is an Australian film director, producer and writer, best known for his work in horror films. He rose to fame in 2005 with his debut feature film, Wolf Creek, creating one of Australia's most memorable and horrific characters, Mick Taylor (played by John Jarratt).  The long-awaited sequel to his first feature, Wolf Creek 2 was released February 2013. Mclean also wrote, directed and produced Rogue (2007) and was executive producer of Red Hill (2010) and Crawlspace (2012). He is also the co-author of two novels about the fictional character Mick Taylor; Wolf Creek: Origin (with Aaron Sterns) and Wolf Creek: Desolation Game (with Brett McBean) and the four-part comic book series Dark Axis: Secret Battles of WW2 and the graphic novel Sebastian Hawks – Creature Hunter. In 2016, his film, The Darkness, was released to theaters, and a Wolf Creek TV series was released on Australian streaming service Stan.

Biography 
According to the production notes for film Wolf Creek, "after training as a fine artist specializing in painting, McLean attended the National Institute of Dramatic Art (NIDA), completing a graduate diploma in directing." In his early career he worked with theatre director Neil Armfield, and with Baz Luhrmann and Catherine Martin at Opera Australia.

McLean's first short film, Plead, won a Gold award from the Australian Cinematographers Society (ACS). His short film ICQ screened at the New York International Independent Film and Video Festival, winning "Best Director of a Short Film". Under his production company GMF (Greg McLean Film), McLean produced television commercials and similar work.

McLean's first full-length film was the  2005 Australian independent horror film Wolf Creek. Reviews were mixed, but it achieved a cult following. In the United States, it received an NC-17 rating until being edited to obtain an R rating.

Mclean's next film Rogue, in 2007, was about a deadly salt-water crocodile attacking an international group of tourists in Australia's Northern Territory. He was one of the candidates to direct Paranormal Activity 2. McLean produced the Justin Dix thriller Crawlspace.

In February 2013, McLean returned as co-writer (with Aaron Sterns), producer and director for Wolf Creek 2, the sequel to Wolf Creek. John Jarratt reprised his role as serial killer Mick Taylor, and co-starred with Ryan Corr.

McLean also joined The Legend of Ben Hall as an Executive Producer in February 2015.

In 2016, McLean directed the poorly received horror film The Darkness. His next films are The Belko Experiment and then Jungle.

Filmography

Film

Executive producer
 The Edge of Reality (2009) (Short film)
 Red Hill (2010)
 Crawlspace (2012)
 The Legend of Ben Hall (2016)
 Down Under (2016)

Acting roles

Television

References

External links

Australian film directors
Horror film directors
Living people
Year of birth missing (living people)
Australian film producers
Australian screenwriters